Greenacres is a north eastern suburb of Adelaide, South Australia in the City of Port Adelaide Enfield. It is considered to be an inner suburb of greater Adelaide. Hampstead Road and Muller Road intersect at the south west corner of Greenacres, making it a bustling area during rush hour. These form the western and southern boundaries of the suburb, with Fosters Road on the east and Redward Avenue on the northern boundary. Greenacres is home to the Greenacres Shopping Centre, which has as its major shops a Coles supermarket (formerly a BI-LO), The Reject Shop and formerly Sam's Warehouse. The City of Port Adelaide Enfield Greenacres Library & Office is located to the east of the shopping centre precinct. The suburb also features Hampstead Barracks, a small suburban Australian Army base.

Demography

According to the Australian Bureau of Statistics, at the 2006 census the suburb had a population of 2,171, split evenly between males and females. Approximately 33 percent of Greenacres' residents were born overseas, of whom the largest percentage were born in the United Kingdom followed by India, Italy, China and New Zealand. 3.5 percent identified themselves as Indigenous Australians. The majority of the population were employed in trades and technical industries, administration or labouring. The predominant stated religion was Catholic, with 19.6 percent identifying as such.

References

Suburbs of Adelaide